Sakuna Dam is a gravity dam located in Chiba Prefecture in Japan. The dam is used for water supply. The catchment area of the dam is 2.1 km2. The dam impounds about 9  ha of land when full and can store 630 thousand cubic meters of water. The construction of the dam was started on 1971 and completed in 1977.

References

Dams in Chiba Prefecture
1977 establishments in Japan